Back to Sleep may refer to:

 "Back to Sleep" (song), a 2015 song by Chris Brown
 Safe to Sleep public health campaign, formerly known as Back to Sleep
 "Back to Sleep", a song on the 2007 EP The Real Damage by Frank Turner
 "Back to Sleep", a song on the 2012 eponymous album Goliath and the Giants